Matthew DeMarchi (born May 4, 1981) is an American-born Italian former professional ice hockey player who participated at the 2010 IIHF World Championship as a member of the Italy men's national ice hockey team.

Playing career

Amateur
DeMarchi played amateur hockey in the United States Hockey League (USHL) with the North Iowa Huskies before attending the University of Minnesota where he played college hockey with the Minnesota Golden Gophers men's ice hockey team from 1999 - 2002.

Professional
On June 24, 2000, he was selected by New Jersey Devils in the 2nd round (57th overall) of the 2000 NHL Entry Draft. Following his graduation from university, DeMarchi turned professional playing in the American Hockey League (AHL) with the Albany River Rats from 2003 - 2006. He played the 2006–07 AHL season with the Iowa Stars before relocating to Italy to play Serie A ice hockey for start the 2007–08 season.

DeMarchi started the 2007–08 season with the Bolzano-Bozen Foxes, but was playing with HC Asiago before the end of the season. He remained a member of HC Asiago for 4 seasons before ending his career with one season each with Västerås IK and HC Milano.

International
In 2010 DeMarchi was named to the Italy men's national ice hockey team and he participated with that team at the 74th World Championship that was held in Germany from May 7–23, 2010.

Awards and honors

Career statistics

Regular season and playoffs

International

References

External links

1981 births
Albany River Rats players
Asiago Hockey 1935 players
Bolzano HC players
Ice hockey players from Minnesota
Iowa Stars players
Italian ice hockey defencemen
Living people
Minnesota Golden Gophers men's ice hockey players
New Jersey Devils draft picks
North Iowa Huskies players
University of Minnesota alumni
NCAA men's ice hockey national champions